Nougran Shareef is a village in  Jhelum District, Punjab, Pakistan. Nougran Shareef is a village almost 6.9 miles west of the main city Jhelum pass by CMH (Combine Military Hospital), consisting of 610 houses and a population of 6,810 approx.

Mainly tribes are Mirza, Raja(Ghakar), Chaudry,  Qureshi and non farmers' families reside there.

Populated places in Jhelum District